The Asian Rugby Football Union was allotted one place in the 1999 Rugby World Cup by direct qualification (Asia 1) and one place in the repechage tournament. Eight teams participated in the qualification tournament for Asia which was held in three stages. The first two stages (Rounds 1 and 2) were played in 1997  and the last stage (Round 3) was played in 1998.

The three lowest ranked sides played a single round robin tournament (drawn for home or away), with top placed team progressing to the next round and the other two teams dropping out. Rounds two was played in a similar fashion – the three lowest ranked remaining sides (i.e. the winner of the previous round and the next two lowest ranked teams) played a single round robin tournament (drawn for home or away). 

The final stage changed the pattern in that the top two teams from round three progressed to round four, and all matches were played in Singapore.

Round 1

|- bgcolor="C0FFC0"
|||2||2||0||0||48–30||6
|-
|||2||1||0||1||31–41||4
|-
|||2||0||0||2||26–34||2
|}

Round 2

|- bgcolor="C0FFC0"
|||2||2||0||0||82–40||6
|-
|||2||1||0||1||64–46||4
|-
|||2||0||0||2||28–88||2
|}

Round 3

All round 3 games were held in Singapore.

|- bgcolor="C0FFC0"
|||3||3||0||0||221–25||9
|- bgcolor="#ffffcc"
|||3||1||0||2||104–81||5
|-
|||3||1||0||2||57–227||5
|-
|||3||1||0||2||39–88||5
|}

Japan qualified for RWC 1999, South Korea qualified for repechage.

References

1999
Asia
1997 in Asian rugby union
1998 in Asian rugby union